Colombia has submitted films for the Academy Award for Best International Feature Film since 1980. The award is handed out annually by the United States Academy of Motion Picture Arts and Sciences to a feature-length motion picture produced outside the United States that contains primarily non-English dialogue.

The Colombian submission is decided annually by the Consejo Nacional de Cinematografía, a branch of the Colombian Ministry of Culture. , Colombia has entered the competition 30 times, and has been nominated once for an Academy Award.

Submissions
The Academy of Motion Picture Arts and Sciences has invited the film industries of various countries to submit their best film for the Academy Award for Best Foreign Language Film since 1956. The Foreign Language Film Award Committee oversees the process and reviews all the submitted films. Following this, they vote via secret ballot to determine the five nominees for the award. Below is a list of the films that have been submitted by Colombia for review by the Academy for the award by year and the respective Academy Awards ceremony.

In 2004, Colombia announced that it had selected Maria, Full of Grace as its Oscar submission, and the film was touted as an early front-runner to win the award. However, the film was disqualified by AMPAS which said that the film, a drama which had won Best Colombian Feature at the Cartagena Film Festival, featuring mostly Colombian characters and starring Colombian actress Catalina Sandino Moreno in the title role, did not qualify as a majority Colombian production because it was written and directed by an American, Joshua Marston. After an unsuccessful appeal, Colombia was allowed to send El Rey as a replacement. Although it was disqualified, however, Catalina Sandino Moreno was eventually nominated for the Academy Award for Best Actress and holds the title as the only Colombian nominated to an acting category.

Ciro Guerra is currently the director with most submissions with four films, and his 2015 film Embrace of the Serpent is the only Colombian film to be nominated for Best Foreign Language Film. Directors Sergio Cabrera, Carlos Moreno and Jorge Alí Triana have each had their films selected two times, but none have been nominated. Triana's son Rodrigo had one of his films selected in 2006. The actor with the most appearances in the Colombian submissions is renowned Colombian actress Vicky Hernández who co-starred in five of the national nominees. All Colombian submissions were filmed primarily in Spanish, with the exception being Birds of Passage (2018) that was filmed primarily in Wayuu language.

See also
List of Academy Award winners and nominees for Best Foreign Language Film
List of Academy Award-winning foreign language films
Cinema of Colombia
List of Colombian films

Notes

References

External links
The Official Academy Awards Database
The Motion Picture Credits Database
IMDb Academy Awards Page

Colombia
Academy Award